Olegario Víctor Andrade (1839–1882) was an Argentine journalist, poet and politician, who was born in Brazil.
His daughter, Agustina Andrade, was also a poet.

Works
The nest of condors (El nido de cóndores)(1881) (In the black darkness stands)
The Lost Harp (El arpa perdida)
Prometheus (Prometeo)
Atlantis (Atlántida)
San Martin (1878) (not born torrents)

1839 births
1882 deaths
Argentine journalists
Argentine male poets
Federales (Argentina)
People from Rio Grande do Sul
Burials at La Recoleta Cemetery
19th-century journalists
Male journalists
19th-century poets
19th-century male writers